Good Dog, Bad Dog is the fourth studio album by Over the Rhine, released independently in 1996, and reissued with a slightly altered track listing by Virgin/Backporch in 2000.

Track listing

1996 independent release
"Latter Days" - 5:34
"All I Need Is Everything" - 4:54
"Etcetera Whatever" - 4:52
"I Will Not Eat The Darkness" - 1:59
"Faithfully Dangerous" - 4:51
"The Seahorse" - 4:55
"Everyman's Daughter" - 4:10
"A Gospel Number" - 4:31
"Poughkeepsie" - 4:54
"Willoughby" - 3:32
"Jack's Valentine" - 4:37
"Happy To Be So" - 4:45
"Go Down Easy" - 5:20

2000 Virgin/Back Porch re-release
"Latter Days" - 5:34
"All I Need Is Everything" - 4:54
"Etcetera Whatever" - 4:52
"I Will Not Eat The Darkness"  - 1:59
"Faithfully Dangerous" - 4:51
"The Seahorse"  - 4:55
"Everyman's Daughter" - 4:10
"Poughkeepsie"  - 4:54
"Willoughby" - 3:32
"It's Never Quite What It Seems" - 4:06
"Happy To Be So" - 4:45
"Go Down Easy" - 5:20

2008 Over The Rhine/Great Speckled Dog re-release
"Latter Days" - 5:34
"All I Need Is Everything" - 4:54
"Etcetera Whatever" - 4:52
"I Will Not Eat The Darkness"  - 1:59
"Faithfully Dangerous" - 4:51
"The Seahorse"  - 4:55
"Everyman's Daughter" - 4:10
"A Gospel Number" - 4:31
"Poughkeepsie"  - 4:54
"Willoughby" - 3:32
"Jack's Valentine" - 4:37
"Happy To Be So" - 4:45
"Go Down Easy" - 5:20
"It's Never Quite What It Seems" - 4:06

Personnel
Karin Bergquist: vocals, acoustic guitar, twelve string acoustic guitar.
Ric Hordinski: electric guitars, lap steel, E-bow, mellotron, tambourine (A Gospel Number), acoustic guitar (Willoughby).
Brian Kelley: drum kit, percussion.
Linford Detweiler: upright piano, acoustic guitar, bass, electric piano, keyboards, spoken word.

Produced by Linford Detweiler.  Co-Produced by Ric Hordinski.  Cello by Norman Johns, arranged by Linford.  Photography by Michael Wilson.

Miscellaneous
 According to the Q & A section of  Ric's website, Good Dog, Bad Dog is his favorite Over The Rhine record.

References

1996 albums
Over the Rhine (band) albums
Back Porch Records albums